Kitione Kamikamica (born 27 April 1996 in Fiji) is a Fijian rugby union player who plays for  in the Top 14. His playing position is flanker. He made his debut for Fiji in 2021 against .

Reference list

External links
 

1996 births
Fijian rugby union players
Fiji international rugby union players
Living people
Rugby union flankers
Union Bordeaux Bègles players
Rugby Club Vannes players
CA Brive players